Arvind Singh may refer to:
 Arvind Singh (Indian Navy officer)
 Arvind Singh (rower)